Madagascar competed at the 2019 World Aquatics Championships in Gwangju, South Korea from 12 to 28 July.

Swimming

Madagascar entered four swimmers.

Men

Women

Mixed

References

Nations at the 2019 World Aquatics Championships
Madagascar at the World Aquatics Championships
World Aquatics Championships